is a joint-use railway and subway station located in Nakamura-ku, Nagoya, Aichi Prefecture, Japan. It is located 3.1 rail kilometres from the terminus of the Kansai Line at Nagoya Station and is 0.9 kilometers from the terminus of the Hiagashiyama Line at Takabata Station.

Lines

Kansai Main Line

 (Station number: H02)

Layout
JR Hatta Station has a one side platform and one island platform serving three tracks. The Nagoya Municipal Subway portion of the station has a single underground island platform.

Platforms

Adjacent stations

|-
!colspan=5|Central Japan Railway Company (JR Central)

History
Hatta Station was established as Hatta Signal Stop on the Japanese Government Railways (JGR) on July 15, 1918. It was elevated in status to a full station on February 1, 1928. The JGR became the JNR (Japan National Railways) after World War II. The Nagoya Municipal Subway began operations on September 21, 1982. With the privatization of the JNR on April 1, 1987, the station came under the control of JR Central. The station was completely rebuilt on April 7, 2002 and was relocated at that time approximately 500 meters closer to Nagoya.

Station numbering was introduced to the section of the Kansai Main Line operated JR Central in March 2018; Hatta Station was assigned station number CI01.

References

External links

JR Hatta Station home page
Nagoya Municipal Subway Hatta Station home page

Railway stations in Japan opened in 1928
Railway stations in Aichi Prefecture